Etna (formerly Pedro, Aetna Furnace, and Etna Furnace) is an unincorporated community in eastern Elizabeth Township, Lawrence County, Ohio, United States. It lies at an elevation of 620 feet (189 m).

References

Unincorporated communities in Lawrence County, Ohio
Unincorporated communities in Ohio